In taxonomy, Halostagnicola is a genus of the Archaea.

References

Further reading

Scientific journals

Scientific books

Scientific databases

External links

Archaea genera